The An-Nur Tongkang Mosque is a mosque in Donggang Township, Pingtung County, Taiwan. It is the eighth mosque built in Taiwan. It is also the first mosque in Pingtung County.

History
The mosque originally started inside a rented house at 34-1 Fengyu Street (豐漁街) in Donggang Township, in which most of the worshipers are Indonesian fishermen from the area. After enough funds were collected over the past 10 years, worshipers had the idea to purchase the rented house and convert it into a mosque. Due to the reluctance of the house owner to sell it, worshipers had to look for a different house. They finally found one nearby the first house in Xingyu Street (興漁街), which is still located within the same township, and purchased it for an amount of NT$5.4 million. It was then renovated for a cost of NT$1 million with the addition of a wudu area and some air conditioning systems. It was eventually turned into the mosque. The mosque was officially opened on 18 February 2018.

On 9 December 2018, Interior Minister Hsu Kuo-yung honored and paid tribute to the mosque founder in conjunction with the International Migrants Day for his fund raising efforts in establishing the worship place.

Architecture

The mosque is located on the third floor of a three-story house building with a capacity of 120 worshipers. The mosque is also equipped with a Quran reading area and a madrasa.

See also
 Islam in Taiwan
 List of mosques in Taiwan

References

External links

 

2018 establishments in Taiwan
Mosques completed in 2017
Mosques in Taiwan
Religious buildings and structures in Pingtung County